Callum Semple (born 20 September 1998) is a centre-back English professional footballer, who is unsigned. Semple has previously played for Sheffield United's youth academy, Ross County and Queen of the South.

Background
Callum Semple was born and raised in Sheffield. Semple's parents are from Scotland, giving him eligibility to represent England and Scotland at international level.

Career

Sheffield United and Queen of the South loan
Semple is a product of the Blades youth academy. On 13 July 2018, Semple was sent out on loan by Sheffield United to Queen of the South in Dumfries until early January 2019. On 4 August 2018, Semple scored his solitary goal for Queens in their first league match of the 2018-19 season at Cappielow versus Greenock Morton in a 2–2 draw. On 6 January 2019, Semple returned to Bramall Lane after playing for the Doonhamers in their 2–1 away win versus Inverness Caledonian Thistle. Semple played in 27 competitive matches and scored one goal for Queens.

Ross County
On 22 January 2019, Semple signed for the Doonhamers rivals in the Scottish Championship, the Dingwall club Ross County on an 18-month deal.

In his first interview with the Staggies, Semple said that the club had chatted with Gary Naysmith at Queens and he had given Semple a glowing reference.

Queen of the South
On 24 June 2019, Semple signed a one-year contract with Queen of the South after being released by the Staggies.

On 28 December 2019, Semple scored the opening goal in the fourth minute at Somerset Park versus the Honest Men, as Queens won 2–1.

Career statistics

Honours
Ross County
Scottish Championship: 2018–19

References

External links
 
 

1998 births
Living people
English footballers
Sheffield United F.C. players
Queen of the South F.C. players
Ross County F.C. players
Scottish Professional Football League players
Association football defenders